Flëur was a musical collective from the Ukrainian city of Odesa, being unique for the Ukrainian musical scene. The collective was based around the two original members and frontwomen Olga Pulatova (Ольга Пулатова) and Olena Voinarovska (Олена Войнаровська) who wrote the lyrics, performed vocals and wrote most of the music. Although in later years, the whole collective took part in making music and arrangements, lyrics were still written solely by Olena and Olga.
Flëur's musical genre is hard to define as it combines many influences. Flëur originated as cooperation of the two singer-songwriters and the music still bears a tiny resemblance to the genre, yet from the very beginning it was in a way different from typical singer-songwriter music. The first official releases also had a touch of neoclassic/ethereal music.

Because of the difficulties with picking the right term for Flëur's music, the collective itself created the term "cardiowave" (which later gave title to an independent recording label from Odessa which was releasing some of Flëur's sideprojects), but when it comes to more usual terms Flëur usually gets labeled as dream pop.

The texts of the label Prikosnovénie spoke of resemblance with Cocteau Twins, All about Eve and Bel Canto.

Band history
Flëur was formed by Olga Pulatova and Olena Voinarovska in Odessa in February 2000. In March 2000 flautist Yuliya Zemlyana joined them. According to an autobiographical story by Olga Pulatova, it was Yuliya who came up with "Flëur" as a title for their collective.
On 17 March they had their first live concert in Odessa.
During 2000 and 2001 they were joined by Kateryna Serbina (cello), Oleksiy Tkachevsky (drums), Vitaliy Didyk (contrabass) and Oleksiy Dovhaliov(keyboards).

The first official release was the CD "Touch" (which is English translation of "Прикосновение") released on the independent French label Prikosnovénie. Only the album's title was translated to English — all the lyrics and song titles in the CD's booklet are in Russian. One month later the Ukrainian edition of the album came out under the original title "Прикосновение". Two more releases followed on the Prikosnovénie label, but these were also the last ones on this label.
After that Flëur was mostly released in CIS countries.

Currently Flëur has 8 officially released albums plus reissues of two early releases. The song "Шелкопряд" ("Silkworm") had the first place in "Chart Dozen" hit-parade of Russian radio Nashe Radio — Flëur was awarded the "Chart crack" prize as best new band of 2007.

From their inception Flëur's popularity continued slowly but steadily growing. Besides live performances in their hometown of Odessa and Ukraine's Kyiv, the collective also toured extensively in Russia from 2007 to 2012, including many live performances in Moscow which presented them with a full house.

Flëur has also performed live on radio several times, had a TV slot for the song "Искупление" ("Redemption") on the Ukrainian music TV-channel M1 (video directed by Yevhen Tymokhin (Євген Тимохін), musical arrangement made by Pavlo Shevchuk (Павло Шевчук) — the producer of Mumiy Troll band).

Two more albums were released in the following years: "The Awakening" in spring 2012 and "Storm Warning" in 2014.

In early 2017, the band announced that they would be breaking up after playing three last concerts in May. Following Flëur's dissolution, Pulatova and Voinarovska have continued working on their solo musical careers.

Side projects
Many current and former band members also participated in other musical projects.
 Ольга Пулатова (Olga Pulatova) was a vocalist on the projects "Аэроплан" ("Airplane") and "Оля и Монстр" ("Olya and The Monster") (both defunct now), and cooperated closely with the project "Dust Heaven".
 Олена Войнаровська (Olena Voinarovska), Олексій Ткачевський (Oleksiy Tkachevsky), former Flëur member Олексій Довгалєв (Oleksiy Dovhaliev), Катерина Котельникова (Kateryna Kotelnykova) and Анастасія Кузьміна (Anastasiya Kuzmina) took part in the projects "МРФ" ("Мой розовый фашистик", "My Little Pink Fascist") and the English language project "Amurekimuri".
 Олексій Довгальов (Oleksiy Dovhaliov) also has his own project "The Клюквінs" ("The Klukwins", «klukwa» means cranberry in Russian).
 Алла Лужецька (Alla Luzhetska) and Анастасія Кузьміна (Anastasiya Kuzmina) take part in the project "ТИМ" ("Тайный Институт Мозга", "Secret Brain Institute").
 Former Flёur member Юлія Земляна (Yulia Zemlyana) takes part in the projects "Аддарая" ("Addaraya") and "Inversus".
 Євгеній Чеботаренко (Yevheniy Chebotarenko) has his own group "My Personal Murderer".

Members
 Ольга Пулатова (Olga Pulatova) — piano, vocals
 Олена Войнаровська (Olena Voinarovska) — guitar, vocals
 Олексій Ткачевський (Oleksiy Tkachevsky) — drums
 Катерина Котельникова (Kateryna Kotelnykova) — keyboards
 Анастасія Кузьміна (Anastasiya Kuzmina) — violin
 Євгеній Чеботаренко (Yevgeniy Chebotarenko) — bass guitar

Former members
 Юлія Земляна (Yulia Zemlyana) — flute
 Катерина Сербіна (Kateryna Serbina) — cello
 Олексій Довгальов (Oleksiy Dovhaliov) — keyboards, acoustic guitar
 Віталій Дідик (Vitaliy Didyk) — contrabass, bass guitar
 Олександра Дідик (Aleksandra Didyk) — cello
 Алла Лужецька (Alla Luzhetska) — flute
 Владислав Міцовський (Vladyslav Mitsovsky) — percussion
 Георгій Матвіїв (Georgiy Matviyiv) — bandura

Session Members
 Володимир Нессі (Volodymyr Nessi) — bass guitar
 Андрій Басов (Andriy Basov) — electric guitar
 Alex Kozmidi — electric guitar, bass guitar
 Георгій Матвіїв (Georgiy Matviyiv)

Discography

Albums, released in  Russia and Ukraine 
 2002 — Прикосновение ("Soft Touch")

 2003 — Волшебство ("Magic")

 2004 — Сияние ("Shining")

 2006 — Всё вышло из-под контроля ("Everything is out of control")

 2008 — Эйфория ("Euphoria")

 2008 — Почти живой ("Almost alive") and Сердце ("Heart") — reissue of unofficial releases from the years 2000–2001
"Почти живой"

"Сердце"

 2010 — Тысяча светлых ангелов ("Thousands of bright angels")

 2012 — Пробуждение ("Awakening")

 2014 — Штормовое предупреждение ("Storm Warning")

Albums released in France 
 2002 — Prikosnovenie ("Soft Touch")
French edition of "Прикосновение".

 2003 — Volshebstvo ("Magic")
French edition of "Волшебство".

 2004 — Siyanie ("Shine")
French edition of "Сияние".

Collections 
 2007 — Флёрография ("Fleurography")
 2007 — Трилогия ("Trilogy"): "Прикосновение"/"Soft Touch", "Волшебство"/"Magic" and "Сияние"/"Shining"
 2008 — Discography (all albums in MP3)

Singles 
 2007 (December) — Два Облака ("Two clouds")

Unofficial releases 
 2000 (July) — Почти живой ("Almost alive")
 2001 (January) — Сердце ("Heart")
 2001 (November) — Special Edition

External links

References

 Interview with Olga Pulatova for Live174.ru (RUS)
 Exclusive interview with Fleur for ThyDoom.com music portal (RUS)
 Electronic version of Fleur interview for НАШ magazine

Ukrainian musical groups
Prikosnovénie artists